The unofficial 1898 International Cross Country Championships was held in Ville-d'Avray, France, on March 20, 1898.

Complete results, and the results of British athletes were published.

Medallists

Race results

Men's (9 mi /14.5 km)

Team results

Men's

Participation
An unofficial count yields the participation of 16 athletes from 2 countries.

 (8)
 (8)

See also
 1898 in athletics (track and field)

References

International Cross Country Championships
International Cross Country Championships
Cross
International Cross Country Championships
Cross country running in France
International Cross Country Championships